Donald Nicholson (March 20, 1850 - April 30, 1932) was a Canadian politician, who served in the House of Commons of Canada from 1911 to 1921. He represented the Prince Edward Island electoral district of Queen's as a member of the Conservative Party from 1911 to 1917, and the Unionist Party from 1917 to 1921.

Prior to his election to the House of Commons, Nicholson was a tobacco merchant.

Nicholson built two houses on Fitzroy Street in Charlottetown, at house numbers 13 and 15, for his sons Edward and Robert. Both are designated as historic properties by the city of Charlottetown.

John Paton Nicholson, Robert's son and Donald's grandson, later became chief justice of the Supreme Court of Prince Edward Island.

References

External links

1850 births
1932 deaths
People from Charlottetown
Conservative Party of Canada (1867–1942) MPs
Members of the House of Commons of Canada from Prince Edward Island
Canadian merchants